Il Trespolo tutore (Trespolo the Tutor) is a comic opera in three acts by the Italian composer Alessandro Stradella with a libretto by Giovanni Cosimo Villifranchi. It was first performed at the Teatro Falcone, Genoa on 30 or 31 January, 1679. It is considered one of the first Italian comic operas.

Roles

Synopsis
Artemisia is in love with her tutor Trespolo but he is too dull-witted to realise this and is in love with the serving-maid Despina instead. Two brothers, Ciro and Nino, are in love with Artemisia; one of them goes mad and the other, who has been insane, is cured. The plot becomes more and more farcically complicated until, in the end, Trespolo marries Despina and Artemisia marries Ciro.

Sources

The Viking Opera Guide ed. Holden (Viking, 1993)
Del Teatro (in Italian)
Magazine de l'opéra baroque (in French)

Editions
 A new edition by Michael Burden is underway for the Collecetd Works of Stradella

Performances
 In 2004, a staging in a new edition by Michael Burden and with a new English singing translation by Simon Rees was given by New Chamber Opera at New College, Oxford.

Recordings
Andrea de Carlo, Arcana 2020

Italian-language operas
1679 operas
Operas
Operas by Alessandro Stradella